Lalana Bulathshenal Araggelage Priyadarshani (born 1 September 1980) is a Sri Lankan woman cricketer. She has played for Sri Lanka in  a solitary Women's ODI.

References

External links 

1980 births
Living people
Sri Lankan women cricketers
Sri Lanka women One Day International cricketers
Colts Cricket Club cricketers